was a Japanese screenwriter and mystery novelist. He won the Kuniko Mukōda Prize in 1998 for his screenplay Nemureru Mori (A Sleeping Forest) and Kekkon Zen'ya (The Night before the Wedding). He also won the Edogawa Rampo Prize in 1997 for Hasen no marisu (Dotted-line Malice) and the Eiji Yoshikawa Prize for New Writers in 2001 for Shinku (Crimson). The South Korean TV Network SBS broadcast a 16 Episode Drama Alone in Love adapted from one of his novels in 2006. He also wrote Detective Conan - The Phantom of Baker Street.

He was found dead in his office in Tokyo's Meguro ward after he had apparently hanged himself several days earlier.  A note was also found at the scene.

See also 
 Alone in Love

References

External links
 J'Lit | Authors : Hisashi Nozawa | Books from Japan 

1960 births
2004 suicides
Japanese crime fiction writers
Edogawa Rampo Prize winners
Suicides by hanging in Japan
People from Nagoya
Japanese television writers
20th-century Japanese screenwriters